Kenneth Edward Doraty (June 23, 1905 – May 4, 1981) was a Canadian professional ice hockey player who played in 105 National Hockey League games for the Chicago Black Hawks, Toronto Maple Leafs and the Detroit Red Wings between 1926 and 1938. The rest of his career, which lasted from 1925 to 1939, was spent in various minor leagues.

Career
Doraty began his career in the major league Western Hockey League for the Portland Rosebuds. He made his NHL debut for the Chicago Black Hawks the following season. He then spent the next five seasons in the minor league before returning to the NHL with the Toronto Maple Leafs in 1932.

On April 3, 1933, in the fifth game of a best-of-five semifinal, Doraty scored a goal at 4:46 of the sixth overtime to give Toronto 1–0 victory over the Boston Bruins in a Stanley Cup playoff game. The goal ended what was at the time the longest game (104:46 of overtime) in NHL history, and remains to this day the longest game in either team's history.

On January 16, 1934, Doraty scored a hat-trick in overtime to help the Maple Leafs defeat the Ottawa Senators 7-4, becoming the only player to achieve this unusual feat.

The longest overtime game in NHL history was played three years later, on March 24, 1936, and was won 1–0 by Mud Bruneteau of the Detroit Red Wings on a goal at 116:30 of overtime against the Montreal Maroons. The two games cited above are the only two games to reach a sixth overtime in NHL history. Goalie Lorne Chabot played in both marathons, winning the Doraty game and losing the Bruneteau game.

Doraty's NHL career consisted of five seasons.  He scored 15 goals and added 25 assists in regular-season play, and scored seven goals and had two assists in Stanley Cup playoff games.

Doraty served as governor of the Western Canada Junior Hockey League from 1953 to 1956, succeeding Al Pickard.

Career statistics

Regular season and playoffs

References

External links
 

1905 births
1981 deaths
Buffalo Bisons (IHL) players
Canadian expatriate ice hockey players in the United States
Canadian ice hockey forwards
Chicago Blackhawks players
Cleveland Falcons players
Cleveland Indians (IHL) players
Detroit Red Wings players
Ice hockey people from Ottawa
Kitchener Millionaires players
Minneapolis Millers (AHA) players
Pittsburgh Hornets players
Portland Rosebuds players
Regina Pats players
Seattle Seahawks (ice hockey) players
Syracuse Stars (IHL) players
Toronto Maple Leafs players
Toronto Millionaires players